1C Company is a Russian software developer, distributor and publisher based in Moscow. It develops, manufactures, licenses, supports and sells computer software, related services and video games.

In Russia, 1C is considered a leader in business software for its comprehensive business software suite  1C:Enterprise (Russian: 1С:Предприятие, 1C:Predpriyatie). 1C is known as a video game developer and publisher. Titles produced by the company include IL-2 Sturmovik, King's Bounty, Men of War and the Space Rangers series.

History
1C was founded in 1991 by Boris Nuraliev in Moscow, Russia. In 1992, the company published ''1C:Accounting'' (ru), a bookkeeping software. The simplicity, wealth of customization options and its reach through the wide network of dealers, who were entitled to 50% of the sales income, made it possible for the 1C:Accounting software to become the most widespread accounting program across Russia and former USSR states.

In 1999, the first game developed by 1C was published - Konung: Legends of the North. 1C also acquired  company. In 2006, 1C announced that their trademark was considered "well-known" by Rospatent as an intellectual property status in Russia.

In 2008, 1C declared its plan of transforming into a large multisectoral holding company. Part of its growth strategy was establishing joint ventures with leading and promising enterprises within the IT industry.

In May 2005, 1C bought Cenega Publishing, a Prague-based publisher and distributor. This arm was rebranded 1C Publishing EU in May 2007. 1C Publishing EU uses the trade name 1C Entertainment since late 2018.

In 2008, 1C declared it would become a holding company, stating it would establish joint ventures with companies within the IT industry. In October 2011, Baring Vostok Capital Fund acquired a 9% stake of 1C.

In 2012, 1C partnered with 777 Studios to create 1C Game Studios.

By 2015, according to the founder and head of the company Boris Nuraliev, the number of subsidiaries and joint ventures of 1C is about 200 companies.

In April 2016, 1C bought out 27.06% in Megaplan and increased its stake in the company to 99%. In August of the same year, a controlling stake was acquired in the restaurant business automation service Quick Resto. In October, 1C announced the purchase of a controlling stake in the developer of the cloud-based CRM system amoCRM.

In September 2016, 1C together with ASCON, created the Renga Software company - the Russian developer of the Renga integrated BIM system.

In April 2022, 1C Poland was sanctioned by Poland as part of the sanctions against the 2022 Russian invasion of Ukraine

Products

List of business applications 
• 1С:ERP 2 
Information system for enterprise management.

• 1С:Corporate Performance Management 
Planning, accounting, and performance monitoring for holdings and corporations.

• 1С:Document Management (ECM)
Automates document flow, both paper and electronic, for businesses and public institutions.

• 1C:Accounting 
Universal bookkeeping and tax calculation software with Russian Accounting Standards-compliant reporting. In 2018 a new IAS-compliant version was released.

• 1C:Accounting – the most popular accounting software in Russia. According to various estimates, the software is used by 80-90% of Russian companies.

• 1C:Trade Management 
Provides management accounting, planning, and sales data analysis. It automates trade, financial, and warehouse operations, elevating wholesale and retail companies.

• 1С:Retail 
Automated retail outlet and store accounting, including retail networks.

• 1С:Payroll and HR Management 
Payroll calculation and HR management.

• 1С:AccountingSuite
All-in-one business application combining accounting, cloud banking, order management, inventory, project and time tracking.

• 1C:Drive
System to manage operational activities, promote business development in international markets.

1C:Enterprise platform 
The 1C:Enterprise platform is a business application development tool. 1C:Enterprise uses a Domain Driven Design approach to provide the specific tools needed to develop business software. All code-based development is done using a high-level domain-specific language, the source code is genuinely open. 1C:Enterprise platform allows create applications for different operation systems (Windows, Linux, MacOS) and use its as a Cloud services or On-premise. Considered as an alternative development tools instead of the С language family and other integrated development environments (IDE).

Video games
1C began distributing third party games in 1996. In 1997, they published Konung: Legends of the North, which was the best-selling title in Russia during September 1999. 1C has a long history of funding independent developers and producing a great deal of very successful Russian games. 1C works as a publisher and producer with over 30 independent development studios and has produced over 100 projects for PC and consoles, including titles like Hard Truck, King of the Road, Rig'n'Roll, Space Rangers, Soldiers: Heroes of World War II, Faces of War, Men of War and Men of War: Assault Squad series, Fantasy Wars, Death to Spies, King's Bounty series, Ancestors Legacy and Deep Sky Derelicts.

One successful series of combat flight simulators 1C publishes is the IL-2 Sturmovik series, first developed by Maddox Games of Oleg Maddox in 2001 and commercially traded under the brand "1C:Maddox Games", a division of 1C Company.

The company has also developed other games such as Theatre of War (2006), several entries in the Men of War franchise as of 2009 and Royal Quest (2015).

The company is also the largest distributor in Russia, publishing titles of most accomplished international publishers such as Activision Blizzard, Bethesda Game Studios, Take-Two Interactive, Ubisoft, Warner Bros. Interactive Entertainment. 1C owns two local distribution companies, 1C-SoftClub (ru) (formerly known as SoftClub) and the previously independent Russian company Buka Entertainment, which are also market leaders in the distribution of videogames hardware for companies like Sony Computer Entertainment according to 1C. 1C also owns a video games retail chain similar to retail chains like GameStop, named 1C-Interest, which has 30 stores in 22 cities inside Russia.

According to 1C, the company has established an international presence in 2005 by buying a group of distribution companies in Central Europe like the small games publisher ''Cenega Publishing'' (pl), later renamed to 1C Publishing EU based in Czech Republic. Since the purchase, the Cenega group has been transformed into a company for distribution, production and service under the name of 1C Entertainment, with over 400 people employed in Poland, Czech Republic, and Hungary. ''QLOC'' (pl) a subsidiary Cenega is a premium service company, providing porting, co-developing, testing and localization services to development studios and publishers. While ''1C Online Games'' is the publishing and development arm of 1C Entertainment group the company states.

Tencent acquired 1C Entertainment from 1C in November 2021 with the deal closed by February 2022.

1C Entertainment was renamed Fulqrum Games in June 2022

Business software and cloud services

1С:Enterprise business software suite is used for management and business accounting automation in more than 2,000,000 organizations, including major corporations and governmental entities. This system is number one in the Russian ERP market with the largest number of automated workplaces.

Measured by installations, 1C is the leader, with about 5 million users according to 1C Founder Boris Nuraliev in an interview. 
83% of ERP workplaces in Russia is now handled by automated processes developed by 1C.

1C:Enterprise consists of two parts: 1C:Enterprise platform and business applications (1C Applied Solutions). 1C:Enterprise platform (framework) is for rapid development, deployment and flexible customization of business automation applications in the cloud, mobile and classic desktop environments. It is suitable to build scalable applications for small, medium and large organizations.

1C:Enterprise, version 8 was released in 2004 and all following versions were called 1C:Enterprise 8. The current version of 1C:Enterprise platform is 8.3.18.

1CFresh - an online platform for technology to develop, publish and manage cloud technologies and services based on 1C:Enterprise software, combining several cloud applications developed by 1C.

Affiliate network, franchising

According to 1C the company provides its services through a network of partnerships consisting of more than 10,000 long-term partners in 25 countries.

One of the business strategies of 1C on the Russia IT market and several other countries is a franchising business model. About 7000 franchisees in 750 cities of Russia and neighboring countries provide comprehensive service for business automation, deployment, customization and support of 1C:Enterprise-based systems, consulting, user training, etc. 250+ of them have certified its QoS as ISO 9001-compliant.

In 2017 it was reported that 1C maintained a sizeable lead in RBС's publication, for the «Top-50 most popular brands in Russia».

According to Forbes Russia's estimates, the company controls around 12% of the turnover generated by all franchise businesses in Russia.

Distribution

1C is the official distributor of over 100+ software vendors of the likes of ABBYY, Acronis, Aladdin, ALT Linux, Ascon, Entensys, ESET, Famatech, Ideco, Infowatch, Kaspersky Lab, Magix, Microsoft, Movavi, nanoCAD, Oxygen Software, Panda Security, Paragon Mobile, Paragon Software, Redline Software, SmartLine, and others. 1C offers a number of titles of software for office and home use.

References

External links
 

Russian companies established in 1991
Companies based in Moscow
ERP software companies
Russian brands
Software companies of Russia
Video game companies established in 1991
Software companies established in 1991
Video game companies of Russia
Video game development companies
Video game publishers
Tencent divisions and subsidiaries
2022 mergers and acquisitions